List of universities and colleges in Lithuania is a listing of higher education (third level education) institutions in Lithuania.

Universities
There are 18 universities in Lithuania:

Colleges
There are 20 colleges in Lithuania, all but one of them are nonprofit public institutions:

See also 

List of universities in Estonia
List of universities in Latvia
List of colleges and universities by country
List of colleges and universities

References

 Date of establishment is given according to the university's official website.

 
Universities
Lithuania
Lithuania